Vilhelm Reesen (1675-1745) was a Norwegian officer and government official.  He served as a naval officer from 1689 until 1718. He was then appointed as the County Governor of Lister og Mandal county from 1718 until his death in 1745.

References

1675 births
1745 deaths
County governors of Norway